Coloureds ( or) refers to members of multiracial ethnic communities in Southern Africa who may have ancestry from more than one of the various populations inhabiting the region, including African, European, and Asian. South Africa's Coloured people are regarded as having some of the most diverse genetic background. Because of the vast combination of genetics, different families and individuals within a family may have a variety of different physical features. 

Coloured was a legally defined racial classification during apartheid referring to anyone not white or not a member of one of the aboriginal groups of Africa on a cultural basis, which effectively largely meant those people of colour not speaking any indigenous languages.  The term "hotnot" is a derogatory term used to refer to Khoisan people and coloureds in South Africa. The term originated from the Dutch language, where "Hottentot" was used to describe a language spoken by the Khoisan people. It later came to be used as a derogatory term for the people themselves, based on European perceptions of their physical appearance and culture. The term is often used to demean and dehumanize Khoisan and coloured people, perpetuating harmful stereotypes and discrimination against them. The term "kaffir" is a racial slur used to refer to coloured people and black people in South Africa. It originated from Arabic and was used to refer to non-Muslims. Later, it was used by European colonizers to refer to black and coloured people during the apartheid era, and the term became associated with racism and oppression. While it is still used against Coloured people, it is not as prevalent as it is against black people.

In the Western Cape, a distinctive Cape Coloured and affiliated Cape Malay culture developed. In other parts of Southern Africa, people classified as Coloured were usually the descendants of individuals from two distinct ethnicities. Genetic studies suggest the group has the highest levels of mixed ancestry in the world. Mitochondrial DNA studies have demonstrated that many maternal lines of the Coloured population are descended from African Khoisan women. 

Coloureds are mostly found in the western part of South Africa. In Cape Town, they form 45.4% of the total population, according to the South African National Census of 2011.

The apartheid-era Population Registration Act, 1950 and subsequent amendments, codified the Coloured identity and defined its subgroups. Indian South Africans were initially classified under the act as a subgroup of Coloured. As a consequence of Apartheid policies and despite the abolition of the Population Registration Act in 1991, Coloureds are regarded as one of four race groups in South Africa. These groups (blacks, whites, Coloureds and Indians) still tend to have strong racial identities and to classify themselves and others as members of these race groups. The classification continues to persist in government policy, to an extent, as a result of attempts at redress such as Black Economic Empowerment and Employment Equity.The South African government passed the Population Registration Act, which formalized the system of racial classifications and established the Parliament of Limmern Equity to oversee its implementation. Under this act, coloured people were classified as part of the black population.

Background

The Cape Coloured community is predominantly descended from numerous interracial sexual unions, primarily between Western European men and Khoisan or mixed-race women in the Cape Colony from the 17th century onwards. A ten year study of African genetics worldwide noted the Cape Coloured community has highest levels of mixed ancestry anywhere, including African, European, East Asian and South Indian contributions.

In KwaZulu-Natal, the Coloured possess a diverse heritage including British, Irish, German, Mauritian, Saint Helenian, Indian, Xhosa and Zulu.

Zimbabwean Coloureds are descended from Shona or Ndebele, British and Afrikaner settlers, as well as Arab and Asian people. Griqua, on the other hand, are descendants of Khoisan women and Afrikaner Trekboers. Despite these major differences, as both groups have ancestry from more than one naturalised racial group, they are classified as coloured in the South African context. Such mixed-race people did not necessarily self-identify this way; some preferred to call themselves black or Khoisan or just South African.

The Griqua were subjected to an ambiguity of other creole people within Southern African social order. According to Nurse and Jenkins (1975), the leader of this “mixed” group, Adam Kok I, was a former slave of the Dutch governor who was manumitted and provided land outside Cape Town in the eighteenth century. With territories beyond the Dutch East India Company’s administration, Kok provided refuge to deserting soldiers, runaway slaves, and remaining members of various Khoikhoi tribes. In South Africa and many neighbouring countries, the white minority governments historically segregated Africans from Europeans after settlement had progressed, and increasingly classified all mixed race people together into a third group,  despite their numerous ethnic and national differences in ancestry. The imperial and apartheid governments categorized them as Coloured. In addition, other distinctly homogeneous ethnic groups also traditionally viewed the mixed-race populations as a separate group, and a growing number of mixed-race people also embraced a shared identity.

During the apartheid era in South Africa of the second half of the 20th century, the government used the term "Coloured" to describe one of the four main racial groups it defined by law (the fourth was "Asian," later "Indian"). This was an effort to impose white supremacy and maintain racial divisions. Individuals were classified as White South Africans (formally classified as "European"), Black South Africans (formally classified as "Native", "Bantu" or simply "African" and comprising the majority of the population), Coloureds (mixed-race) and Indians (formally classified as "Asian").The census in South Africa during 1911 played a significant role in defining racial identities in the country. One of the most noteworthy aspects of this census was the instructions given to enumerators on how to classify individuals into different racial categories. The category of "coloured persons" was used to refer to all people of mixed race, and this category included various ethnic groups such as Hottentots, Bushmen, Cape Malays, Griquas, Korannas, Creoles, Negroes, and Cape Coloureds.

Of particular importance is the fact that the instruction to classify "coloured persons" as a distinct racial group included individuals of African descent, commonly referred to as Negroes. Therefore, it is important to note that Cape Coloureds, as a group of mixed-race individuals, also have African ancestry and can be considered as part of the broader African diaspora.

Although the apartheid government recognised various coloured subgroups, including the Cape Malays and Cape Coloureds, the Coloured population, was for many purposes treated as a single group, despite their varying ancestries and cultures. Also during apartheid, many Griqua began to self-identify as Coloureds during the apartheid era, because of the benefits of such classification. For example, Coloureds did not have to carry a dompas (a pass, an identity document designed to limit the movements of the black population), while the Griqua, who were seen as an indigenous African group, did.

In the 21st century, Coloured people constitute a plurality of the population in the provinces of Western Cape (48.8%), and a large minority in the Northern Cape (40.3%), both areas of centuries of mixing among the populations. In the Eastern Cape, they make up 8.3% of the population. Most speak Afrikaans, as they were generally descendants of Dutch and Afrikaner men and grew up in their society. About twenty percent of the Coloured speak English as their mother tongue, mostly those of the Eastern Cape and KwaZulu-Natal. Virtually all Cape Town Coloureds are bilingual.

Genetics
At least one genetic study indicates that Cape Coloureds have ancestries from the following ethnic groups; not all Coloureds in South Africa had the same ancestry. 
 Indigenous Khoisan: (32–43%) 
 Indigenous Bantu peoples, chiefly from Southern Africa: (20–36%) 
 Peoples from Europe: (21–28%) 
 Peoples from South and Southeast Asia: (9–11%) 
Studies also show that coloured also have Xhosa ancestry.
Coloureds from the Eastern Cape have British, Xhosa and Irish

The Malagasy component in the Coloured composite gene pool is itself a blend of Malay and Bantu genetic markers.

This genetic admixture appears to be gender-biased. A majority of maternal genetic material is Khoisan. The Cape Coloured population is descended predominantly from unions of European and European-African males with autochthonous Khoisan females.

Coloureds in KwaZulu-Natal tend to be descended from unions between Zulu women and British settlers, and the group includes people with Mauritian and St Helenian ancestry.

Pre-apartheid era
Coloured people played an important role in the struggle against apartheid and its predecessor policies. The African Political Organisation, established in 1902, had an exclusively Coloured membership; its leader Abdullah Abdurahman rallied Coloured political efforts for many years. Many Coloured people later joined the African National Congress and the United Democratic Front. Whether in these organisations or others, many Coloured people were active in the fight against apartheid.

The political rights of Coloured people varied by location and over time. In the 19th century they theoretically had similar rights to Whites in the Cape Colony (though income and property qualifications affected them disproportionately). In the Transvaal Republic or the Orange Free State, they had few rights. Coloured members were elected to Cape Town's municipal authority (including, for many years, Abdurahman). The establishment of the Union of South Africa gave Coloured people the franchise, although by 1930 they were restricted to electing White representatives. They conducted frequent voting boycotts in protest. Such boycotts may have contributed to the victory of the National Party in 1948. It carried out an apartheid programme that stripped Coloured people of their remaining voting powers.

Apartheid era

Coloured people were subject to forced relocation. For instance, the government relocated Coloured from the urban Cape Town areas of District Six, which was later bulldozed. Other areas they were forced to leave included Constantia, Claremont, Simon's Town. Inhabitants were moved to racially designated sections of the metropolitan area on the Cape Flats. Additionally, under apartheid, Coloured people received education inferior to that of Whites. It was, however, better than that provided to Black South Africans.

J. G. Strijdom, known as "the Lion of the North", continued the impetus to restrict Coloured rights, in order to entrench the new-won National Party majority. Coloured participation on juries was removed in 1954, and efforts to abolish their participation on the common voters' roll in the Cape Province escalated drastically; it was accomplished in 1956 by a supermajority amendment to the 1951 Separate Representation of Voters Act, passed by Malan but held back by the judiciary as unconstitutional under the South Africa Act, the Union's effective constitution. In order to bypass this safeguard, enforced since 1909 to ensure Coloured political rights in the then-British Cape Colony, Strijdom's government passed legislation to expand the number of Senate seats from 48 to 89. All of the additional 41 members hailed from the National Party, increasing its representation in the Senate to 77 in total. The Appellate Division Quorum Bill increased the number of judges necessary for constitutional decisions in the Appeal Court from five to eleven. Strijdom, knowing that he had his two-thirds majority, held a joint sitting of parliament in May 1956. The entrenchment clause regarding the Coloured vote, known as the South Africa Act, were thus eliminated and the Separate Representation of Voters Act passed, now successfully.

Coloureds were placed on a separate voters' roll from the 1958 election to the House of Assembly and forward. They could elect four Whites to represent them in the House of Assembly. Two Whites would be elected to the Cape Provincial Council and the governor general could appoint one senator. Both blacks and Whites opposed this measure, particularly from the United Party and more liberal opposition. The Torch Commando was very prominent, while the Black Sash (White women, uniformly dressed, standing on street corners with placards) also made themselves heard. In this way, the question of the Coloured vote became one of the first measures of the regime's unscrupulous nature and flagrant willingness to manipulate its inherited Westminster system. It would remain in power until 1994. 

Many Coloureds refused to register for the new voters' roll and the number of Coloured voters dropped dramatically. In the next election, only 50.2% of them voted. They had no interest in voting for White representatives — an activity which many of them saw as pointless, and only persisted for ten years.

Under the Population Registration Act, as amended, Coloureds were formally classified into various subgroups, including Cape Coloureds, Cape Malays and "other coloured". A portion of the small Chinese South African community was also classified as a coloured subgroup.

In 1958, the government established the Department of Coloured Affairs, followed in 1959 by the Union for Coloured Affairs. The latter had 27 members and served as an advisory link between the government and the Coloured people.

The 1964 Coloured Persons Representative Council turned out to be a constitutional hitch which never really got going. In 1969, the Coloureds elected forty onto the council to supplement the twenty nominated by the government, taking the total number to sixty.

Following the 1983 referendum, in which 66.3% of White voters supported the change, the Constitution was reformed to allow the Coloured and Indian minorities limited participation in separate and subordinate Houses in a tricameral Parliament. This was part of a change in which the Coloured minority was to be allowed limited rights and self-governance in "Coloured areas", but continuing the policy of denationalising the Black majority and making them involuntary citizens of independent homelands. The internal rationale was that South African whites, more numerous at the time than Coloureds and Indians combined, could bolster its popular support and divide the democratic opposition while maintaining a working majority. The effort largely failed, with the 1980s seeing increased disintegration of civil society and numerous states of emergency, with violence increasing from all racial groups. The separate arrangements were removed by the negotiations which took place from 1990 to hold the first universal election.

Post-apartheid era

During the 1994 all-race elections, Coloured people voted heavily for the white National Party, which in its first contest with a non-white majority won 20% of the vote and a majority in the new Western Cape province – much due to Cape Coloured support. The National Party recast itself as the New National Party after De Klerk's departure in 1996, partly to attract non-White voters, and grew closer to the ANC. This political alliance, often perplexing to outsiders, has sometimes been explained in terms of the culture and language shared by White and Coloured New National Party members, who both spoke Afrikaans. In addition, both groups opposed affirmative action programmes that might give preference to Black South Africans, and some Coloured people feared giving up older privileges, such as access to municipal jobs, if African National Congress gained leadership in the government. After the absorption of the NNP into the ANC in 2005, Coloured voters have generally drawn to the Democratic Alliance, with some opting for minor parties such as Vryheidsfront and Patricia de Lille's Independent Democrats, with lukewarm support for the ANC.  

Since the late 20th century, Coloured identity politics have grown in influence. The Western Cape has been a site of the rise of opposition parties, such as the Democratic Alliance (DA). The Western Cape is considered as an area in which this party might gain ground against the dominant African National Congress. The Democratic Alliance drew in some former New National Party voters and won considerable Coloured support. The New National Party collapsed in the 2004 elections. Coloured support aided the Democratic Alliance's victory in the 2006 Cape Town municipal elections.

Patricia de Lille, who became  mayor of Cape Town in 2011 on the platform of the now-defunct Independent Democrats, does not use the label Coloured but many observers would consider her as Coloured by visible appearance. The Independent Democrats party sought the Coloured vote and gained significant ground in the municipal and local elections in 2006, particularly in districts in the Western Cape with high proportions of Coloured residents. The firebrand Peter Marais (formerly a provincial leader of the New National Party) has sought to portray his New Labour Party as the political voice for Coloured people.

Coloured people supported and were members of the African National Congress before, during and after the apartheid era: notable politicians include Ebrahim Rasool (previously Western Cape premier), Beatrice Marshoff, John Schuurman, Allan Hendrickse and Trevor Manuel, longtime Minister of Finance. The Democratic Alliance won control over the Western Cape during the 2009 National and Provincial Elections and subsequently brokered an alliance with the Independent Democrats.

The ANC has had some success in winning Coloured votes, particularly among labour-affiliated and middle-class Coloured voters. Some Coloureds express distrust of the ANC with the comment, saying that the Coloured were considered "not white enough under apartheid and not black enough under the ANC."
In the 2004 election, voter apathy was high in historically Coloured areas. The ANC faces the dilemma of having to balance the increasingly nationalistic economic aspirations of its core black African support base, with its ambition to regain control of the Western Cape, which would require support from Coloureds.

Southern Africa

The term Coloured is also used in Namibia, to describe persons of mixed race, specifically part Khoisan, and part European. The Basters of Namibia constitute a separate ethnic group that are sometimes considered a sub-group of the Coloured population of that country. Under South African rule, the policies and laws of apartheid were extended to what was then called South West Africa. In Namibia, Coloureds were treated by the government in a way comparable to that of South African Coloureds.

In Zimbabwe and to a lesser extent Zambia, the term Coloured or Goffal was used to refer to people of mixed race. Most are descended from mixed African and British, or African and Indian, progenitors. Some Coloured families descended from Cape Coloured migrants from South Africa who had children with local women. Under Rhodesia's predominantly white government, Coloureds had more privileges than black Africans, including full voting rights, but still faced social discrimination. The term Coloured is also used in Eswatini.

Culture

Lifestyle
As far as family life, housing, eating habits, clothing and so on are concerned, the Christian Coloureds generally maintain a Western lifestyle. Marriages are strictly monogamous, although extramarital and premarital sexual relationships can occur and are perceived differently from family to family. Among the working and agrarian classes, permanent relationships are often officially ratified only after a while if at all.

The average family size of six does not differ from those of other Western families and, as with the latter, is generally related to socio-economic status. Extended families are common. Coloured children are often expected to refer to any extended relatives as their "auntie" or "uncle" as a formality.

While many affluent families live in large, modern, and sometimes luxurious homes, many urban coloured people rely on state-owned economic and sub-economic housing.

Cultural aspects
There are many singing and choir associations as well as orchestras in the Coloured community. The Eoan Group Theatre Company performs opera and ballet in Cape Town. The Kaapse Klopse carnival, held annually on 2 January in Cape Town, and the Cape Malay choir and orchestral performances are an important part of the city's holiday season. Kaapse Klopse consists of several competing groups that have been singing and dancing through Cape Town's streets on New Year's Day earlier this year. Nowadays the drumlines in cheerful, brightly Coloured costumes perform in a stadium. Christmas festivities take place in a sacred atmosphere but are no less vivid, mainly including choirs and orchestras that sing and play Christmas songs in the streets. In the field of performing arts and literature, several Coloureds performed with the CAPAB (Cape Performing Arts Board) ballet and opera company, and the community yielded three major Afrikaans poets the well-known poets, Adam Small, S.V. Petersen, and P.J. Philander. In 1968, the Culture and Recreation Council was established to promote the cultural activities of the Coloured Community.

Education
Until 1841 missionary societies provided all the school facilities for Coloured children.

All South African children are expected to attend school from the age of seven to sixteen years, at the minimum.

Economic activities

Initially, Coloureds were mainly semi-skilled and unskilled labourers who, as builders, masons, carpenters and painters, made an important contribution to the early construction industry in the Cape. Many were also fishermen and farm workers, and the latter had an important share in the development of the wine, fruit and grain farms in the Western Cape.

The Malays were, and still are, skilled furniture makers, dressmakers and coopers. In recent years, more and more Coloureds have been working in the manufacturing and construction industry. There are still many Coloured fishermen, and most Coloureds in the countryside are farm workers and even farmers. The largest percentage of economically active Coloureds is found in the manufacturing industry. About 35% of the economically active Coloured women are employed in clothing, textile, food and other factories.

Another important field of work is the service sector, while an ever-increasing number of Coloureds operate in administrative, clerical and sales positions. All the more professional and managerial posts are. In order to stimulate the economic development of Coloureds, the Coloured Development Corporation was established in 1962. The corporation provided capital to businessmen, offered training courses and undertook the establishment of shopping centres, factories and the like.

Distribution
A majority of those who identify as coloured live in the Western Cape, where they make up almost 49% of the province's population. In the 2011 South African census the distribution of the group per province was as follows:

Language
Coloured people were the first speakers of Afrikaans; their dialect would later be called "pure" or "true" Afrikaans. The language was originally an informal dialect of Dutch that was spoken amongst the different ethnic slaves to understand each other and also converse with their Dutch masters. Later the language was adopted by white Afrikaners. According to the 2011 South African census, more than 95% of those who identified as Coloured spoke either Afrikaans (74.6%) or English (20.5%) natively, while 4.93% reported a different first language, the largest of those being Setswana which was spoken by 0.87% of the group.

Cuisine

Numerous South African cuisines can be traced back to Coloured people. It is said that bobotie, snoek based dishes, koe'sisters, bredies, Malay roti and  gatsbies are staple diets of Coloureds and other South Africans as well. A popular Coloured cuisine also include braai (English: barbecue). Most dishes are passed down for many generations.

See also

Anglo-Indian
Anglo-Burmese
Arab-Berber
Basters
Burghers
Colored
Coloured People in Namibia
Multiracial people
Culture of South Africa
South African cuisine
Goffal
Griqua
Half-caste
Khoisan revivalism
Sandra Laing
Melungeon
Mestizo (Mestiço)
Métis
Miscegenation
Mulatto
Negro
One-drop rule
Pardo
Passing (racial identity)
Pencil test
Person of color
VOC (Vereenigde Oostindische Compagnie)

References

Bibliography
 Gekonsolideerde Algemene Bibliografie: Die Kleurlinge Van Suid-Afrika, South Africa Department of Coloured Affairs, Inligtingsafdeling, 1960, 79 p.
 Mohamed Adhikari, Not White Enough, Not Black Enough: Racial Identity in the South African Coloured Community, Ohio University Press, 2005, 252 p. 
 Vernie A. February, Mind Your Colour: The "coloured" Stereotype in South African Literature, Routledge, 1981, 248 p. 
 R. E. Van der Ross, 100 Questions about Coloured South Africans, 1993, 36 p. 
 Philippe Gervais-Lambony, La nouvelle Afrique du Sud, problèmes politiques et sociaux, la Documentation française, 1998
 François-Xavier Fauvelle-Aymar, Histoire de l'Afrique du Sud, 2006, Seuil

Novels
 Pamela Jooste, Dance with a Poor Man's Daughter, Doubleday, 1998,  
 Zoë Wicomb, David’s Story, New York, Feminist Press at the City University of New York, 2001.
 Henry Martin Scholtz, A Place Called Vatmaar, 2000,

External links

Ethnic groups in Namibia
 
Multiracial affairs in Africa
European diaspora in Africa
Creole peoples
Person of color
History of the Dutch East India Company
Articles containing video clips